Butte City (formerly, Butte) is an unincorporated community in Glenn County, California. Butte City has varied outdoor recreation opportunities including fishing and boating on the Sacramento River (serviced by the Butte City boat ramp) and also duck hunting seasonally. The area surrounding the town is primarily used for agriculture, including rice, walnuts, alfalfa, and corn. Butte City is served by a volunteer fire department, but has no police department.

History

The first post office at Butte City was established in 1883. A cemetery is located east of town where historical residents of the area are buried. In earlier times, the town had a restaurant, a store, and a bank, but these businesses have all closed.

References

Unincorporated communities in California
Unincorporated communities in Glenn County, California
Populated places on the Sacramento River